The Peasant and the Nest Robber (also The Peasant and the Birdnester) is an oil-on-panel painting by the Netherlandish Renaissance artist Pieter Bruegel the Elder, painted in 1568. It is in the Kunsthistorisches Museum in Vienna.

Description
This painting was in the collections of   since 1569; passed on to the imperial collection, it became part of those of the Kunsthistorisches Museum at its inauguration. Painted the year before the artist's death, this painting, like other late works such as The Land of Cockaigne, The Peasant Dance, and The Peasant Wedding, is dominated by monumental figures. Immediately after his return from Italy, Bruegel showed no apparent interest in Italian figure types and compositions, reverting to the Antwerp tradition in which he had been trained. However, in these late works he shows that his study of Italian painting had taken root: these figures demonstrate his knowledge of Italian art and in particular the art of Michelangelo.

This unusual subject apparently illustrates a Netherlandish proverb:  Dije den nest Weet dijen weeten, dijen Roft dij heeten He who knows where the nest is, has the knowledge, he who robs, has the nest. The painting presents a moralising contrast between the active, wicked individual and the passive man who is virtuous in spite of adversity (a similar theme appears in his drawing The Beekeepers) And lastly it could be suggested that the pointing man is making judgement on the robber whilst not aware that he is nearly stepping into the water in front of him.

It has been suggested that, with his knowledge of Italian art, Bruegel intended the peasant's gesture as a profane parody of the gesture of Leonardo's St John see image at left.

Notes and references

External links

The Peasant and the Nest Robber at the Kunsthistorisches Museum (German)
Notes on the painting, on Frammenti d'Arte Accessed 4 February 2012 
Bosch Bruegel Society
99 works by Pieter Bruegel the Elder
 Creative Bruegel laid the foundation of the Netherlands School (Russian)

1568 paintings
Paintings by Pieter Bruegel the Elder
Paintings in the collection of the Kunsthistorisches Museum